Francesco da Ponte the Elder, or Francesco Bassano the Elder (c. 1475–1539) was an Italian painter of the Renaissance Venetian School.

He was born at Vicenza. After training in Venice he established himself at Bassano. If not an actual pupil of Giovanni Bellini, he was a follower of his style. He painted a St. Bartholomew for the cathedral of Bassano, an altarpiece for the church of San Giovanni, and a Descent of the Holy Ghost for the village church of Oliero. Francesco died in Bassano. His son, Jacopo da Ponte gained prominence as a painter in Venice and the Veneto. One of Jacopo's sons was the painter Francesco da Ponte the Younger.

He died at Bassano del Grappa in 1539.

References

1470s births
1530 deaths
People from Vicenza
People from Bassano del Grappa
15th-century Italian painters
Italian male painters
16th-century Italian painters
Painters from Venice
Italian Renaissance painters